Yamato Citizens Gymnasium Maebashi is an arena in Maebashi, Gunma, Japan. It is the home arena of the Gunma Crane Thunders of the B.League, Japan's professional basketball league.

References

External links
Maebashi Civic Sports Center

Basketball venues in Japan
Gunma Crane Thunders
Indoor arenas in Japan
Sports venues in Gunma Prefecture
Maebashi
1980 establishments in Japan
Sports venues completed in 1980